Basırlar is a village in the İhsaniye District, Afyonkarahisar Province, Turkey. Its population is 79 (2021).

References

Villages in İhsaniye District